MacLehose may refer to:
People
Agnes Maclehose (1758–1841), "Clarinda", Scottish poet and socialite
Christopher MacLehose (born 1940), British publisher
Murray MacLehose, Baron MacLehose of Beoch (1917–2000), British diplomat, Governor of Hong Kong
Other
James MacLehose and Sons, a 19th-century Scottish printer and publisher
MacLehose Medical Rehabilitation Centre, a hospital in Hong Kong
MacLehose Press, an imprint of London-based publisher Quercus
MacLehose Trail, a 100-kilometre hiking trail in Hong Kong